A number of metrics are available to marketers interested in search engine optimization. Search engines and software creating such metrics all use their own crawled data to derive at a numeric conclusion on a website's organic search potential. Since these metrics can be manipulated, they can never be completely reliable for accurate and truthful results.

Google PageRank

Google PageRank (Google PR) is one of the methods Google uses to determine a page's relevance or importance. Important pages receive a higher PageRank and are more likely to appear at the top of the search results. Google PageRank (PR) is a measure from 0 - 10. Google PageRank is based on backlinks. PageRank works by counting the number and quality of links to a page to determine a rough estimate of how important the website is. The underlying assumption is that more important websites are likely to receive more links from other websites. However, Google claims there will be no more PageRank updates, rendering this metric as outdated. As of 15 April 2016, Google has officially removed the PR score from their Toolbar.

Alexa Traffic Rank

Alexa Traffic Rank is based on the amount of traffic recorded from users that have the Alexa toolbar installed over a period of three months. A site's ranking is based on a combined measure of Unique Visitors and Pageviews. Unique Visitors are determined by the number of unique Alexa users who visit a site on a given day. Pageviews are the total number of Alexa user URL requests for a site. Alexa's Traffic Ranks are for domains only and do not give separate rankings for subpages within a domain or subdomains. At the end of 2021, Amazon announced that the Alexa project was going to be discontinued on May 1, 2022.

Moz Domain Authority

Domain Authority (DA), a website metric developed by Moz, is a predictive metric to determine a website's traffic and organic search engine rankings. Domain Authority is based on different link metrics, such as number of linking root domains, number of total backlinks, and the distance of backlinks from the home page of websites.

Moz Page Authority

Compared to Domain Authority which determines the ranking strength of an entire domain or subdomain, Page Authority measures the strength of an individual page.

It's a score developed by Moz on a 100-point logarithmic scale. Unlike TrustFlow, domain authority does not account for spam.

Netcraft 
Similar to many other websites like Alexa, Netcraft features a toolbar that provides users with the ability to view page-hit popularity and various web server metrics along with aggregated user provided website feedback.

References

Search engine optimization